
Year 905 (CMV) was a common year starting on Tuesday (link will display the full calendar) of the Julian calendar.

Events 
 By place 

 Europe 
 Spring – King Berengar I of Italy arranges a truce with the Hungarians, on payment of a tribute. Grand Prince Árpád withdraws from Italy, and begins raiding in Bavaria.
 Louis III, Holy Roman Emperor, launches another attempt to invade Italy. A Frankish expeditionary force led by Adalbert I of Ivrea captures Pavia and Berengar I retires to Verona.
 July 21 – Berengar I and a hired Hungarian army defeat the Frankish force at Verona. They take Louis III as prisoner and Berengar blinds him for breaking his oath.
 Louis III returns to Provence. Unable to govern properly, he relinquishes the government of Lower Burgundy to his cousin Hugh, Count of Arles. 
 Sancho I succeeds Fortún I as King of Pamplona, and creates a Basque kingdom centered in Navarre (modern-day Spain).

 Britain 
 Cadell ap Rhodri, king of Seisyllwg (Wales), makes his 25-year-old son Hywel ap Cadell ruler of Dyfed, having conquered that territory. Rhodri ap Hyfaidd, nominally king of Dyfed, is caught and executed, at Arwystli.
 Norse settlers under the Viking warlord Ingimundr, revolt against the Mercians and try to capture the city of Chester. They are beaten off.

 Arabian Empire 
 Summer – Caliph Al-Muktafi sends an Abbasid army (10,000 men) led by Muhammad ibn Sulayman to re-establish control over Syria and Egypt. The campaign is supported from the sea by a fleet from the frontier districts of Cilicia under Damian of Tarsus. He leads his ships up the Nile River, raids the coast, and intercepts the supplies for the Tulunids.
 Ahmad ibn Kayghalagh, an Abbasid military officer, is appointed governor of the provinces of Damascus and Jordan. He is sent to confront a pro-Tulunid rebellion under Muhammad ibn Ali al-Khalanji. The latter manages to capture Fustat and proclaims the restoration of the Tulunids, while the local Abbasid commander withdraws to Alexandria.

 Asia 
 China loses control over Annam (Northern Vietnam). The village notable Khuc Thua Du leads a rebellion against the Tang Dynasty. The Chinese garrison at Tong Binh (modern Hanoi) is destroyed. Khuc Thua Du declares Annam autonomous.
 Abaoji, a Khitan tribal leader, leads 70,000 cavalry into Shanxi (Northern China) to create a 'brotherhood' with Li Keyong, a Shatuo governor (jiedushi) of the Tang Dynasty.
 Emperor Daigo of Japan orders the selection of four court poets, led by Ki no Tsurayuki, to compile the Kokin Wakashū, an early anthology of Waka poetry.

 By topic 

 Religion 
 Naum of Preslav, a Bulgarian missionary, founds a monastery on the shores of Lake Ohrid (modern-day North Macedonia), which later receives his name.

Births 
 Abu al-Misk Kafur, Muslim vizier (d. 968)
 Al-Mustakfi, Abbasid caliph (d. 949)
 Constantine VII, Byzantine emperor (d. 959)
 Fulk II, Frankish nobleman (approximate date)
 Godfrey, Frankish nobleman (approximate date)

Deaths 
 March 17 – Li Yu, Prince of De, prince of the Tang Dynasty
 July 5
 Cui Yuan, Chinese chancellor
 Dugu Sun, Chinese chancellor
 Lu Yi, Chinese chancellor (b. 847)
 Pei Shu, Chinese chancellor (b. 841)
 Wang Pu, Chinese chancellor
 Du Hong, Chinese warlord
 Gai Yu, Chinese warlord
 Pei Zhi, Chinese chancellor
 Tribhuvana Mahadevi III, Indian Queen Regnant
 Rhodri ap Hyfaidd, king of Dyfed
 Yahya ibn al-Qasim, Idrisid emir of Morocco
 Yang Xingmi, Chinese governor (b. 852)

References